Penglai, formerly known as Dengzhou or Tengchow, is a district belonging to the prefecture-level city of Yantai, Shandong Province, in the People's Republic of China. It lies on the northwest corner of the Shandong Peninsula on the southern coast of the Gulf of Bohai. Penglai is famous for its mirages out at sea, which are frequent during May and June. Formerly a county-level city, Penglai became a district of Yantai City in 2020.

Geography
Penglai is entirely surrounded by other divisions of Yantai: Fushan District is to the east, Longkou City to the west, and Qixia City to the south. Its limits in geographic coordinates are 37° 25'–37° 50' N, 120° 35'–121° 09' E.

Climate

History
The Red Cliffs of the area are reputed to have been the site where the Eight Immortals set out for the land of the immortals and where Qin Shi Huang later sent off five hundred boys and five hundred girls on ships to search for them. Chinese legends held that a mystic dolphin was seen from the cliffs above and, missing it with his spear, the emperor knew that his days were numbered. The Martial Emperor of Han (Han Wudi) later also visited the area while searching for the elixir of immortality.

The old city walls incorporate guard towers of three stories (rather than the usual two) because the uncle of the first emperor of the 6th-century Sui dynasty had been prince of the area. Under the Ming, the harbor was fortified and used by the war junks of the imperial navy.

During the early years of the Manchu invasion of China, Portuguese artillerists were instructing Ming forces at Dengzhou when it was besieged by a mutinous army under Kong Youde in February 1632. Captain Gonçalo Teixeiro was killed during its sack, but the 70-year-old Jesuit linguist João Rodrigues escaped by jumping from the city walls into the sea. Kong's forces then seized the Portuguese cannon and used them to pillage the countryside before joining the Manchu invaders who eventually established China's Qing Dynasty.

Following the Second Opium War, Dengzhou became the first port opened to foreigners on the Shandong Peninsula in 1858. Christian missions were quickly established.

Penglai is mentioned in the fictional stories about Judge Dee by Robert van Gulik, first mentioned in the book The Chinese Gold Murders.

In 2020, Changdao County, consisting of the Changdao Islands in the Bohai Strait, was merged into Penglai.

Administration

The city contains five subdistricts,seven townships  and three development zones:
Subdistricts
 Dengzhou Subdistrict: where Qin Shi Huang reputedly visited to gain immortality

Towns

Others
 Penglai Economic Development Zone: contains three industrial parks
 Penglai Tourism-Vacation Area
 Penglai Urban District

Together, the three qu (zone, district, and area) co-exist with the coastal Xingang Subdistrict.

Economy
374,400 Penglai citizens work in agriculture, with the remaining 75,600 in various other sectors.

Tourism 

Penglai has been ranked by the Chinese government as a top domestic tourist destination. Its Water Fortress (Shuíchéng), a fortified harbor, is one of China's oldest military ports. It was built under the Ming in 1376 and housed a fleet of warjunks. It is now a protected historical monument being renovated at a cost of 500m RMB (more than $60m). There is a plank walk along the cliffs nearby.

More than US$25 million has also been invested into developing the Penglai Pavilion and other sites. The Penglai Pavilion is a large park of ancient buildings, palaces and temples, that have been restored and rebuilt. It has been a tourist goal for more than a thousand years, and the site features inscriptions from famous poets and calligraphers like Su Shi and Dong Qichang. Among other cultural attractions of Penglai are the Naval Museum with exhibits of ancient ships and the restored residence of the famous patriotic general Qi Jiguang. Penglai also has the largest ocean aquarium in Asia. It includes a polar area, a shark hall, a tropical rainforest, and a theater with mermaids, dolphins and sea lions. A picturesque festival takes place in January for the birthday of Tianhou, a local sea goddess.

While tourism is the mainstay of Penglai's economy, bringing more than two million tourists annually, in fact the entire center of the town around the harbour was walled off and completely razed in 2006.

Wine industry 
The production of wine is the second largest industry in the province. Agriculture is first. However, in Penglai, tourism is the primary industry, and wine-making is second. Most of the soil is loose, well-aerated, and rich in minerals and organic matters that enable full development of the root systems. The wineries are located mainly in the Nanwang Grape Valley and along the Yan-Peng Sightseeing Highway. The main varieties grown there, like Cabernet Sauvignon, Cabernet Gernischt, Merlot, Riesling and Chardonnay, are all reaching 20 years of age, considered to be the golden stage for these grapes. Most of them maintain an average sugar content of above 20%. The Cabernet is especially typical, with good color and a dense fragrance.

Notable residents
Qi Jiguang (戚继光, 1528－1588) Ming Dynasty general and national hero who fought Japanese pirates
Henry Luce (1898–1967) - born in Penglai, founder of TIME, Fortune, and Life.
Ida Pruitt (1888–1985) - born in Penglai, spoke fluent Chinese, prolific writer on China
Wu Peifu (吴佩孚, 1874–1939) - army general, later became one of the most powerful military rulers in China during the Warlord Era (1916–1928)
Meng Xuenong ( 1949- ) - vice-governor and acting governor of Shanxi (as of 2007) and disgraced former Mayor of Beijing Municipality

See also
Other Penglais
Other Dengzhous

Notes

References

External links 

 中国蓬莱 (Penglai, China): official municipal government (in Simplified Chinese)
 Rare Mirage Lasts for 4 Hours off East China Shore
 Cultural and tourist information about Penglai
 Attractions of the Penglai Pavilion area
 Article about a visit to Penglai
 Article describing the Water City

Cities in Shandong
Yantai